Ganesh Talkies is a 2013 Bengali film written and directed by Anjan Dutt. The movie is produced by Reliance Entertainment. It portrays two families of polar opposite Bengali and Marwari communities.

Cast
 Biswajit Chakraborty
 Rajesh Sharma
 Raima Sen
 Chandan Roy Sanyal
 Ekavali Khanna
 Koneenica Banerjee
 Subhra Sourav Das
 Pallavi Chatterjee
 Taranga Sarkar
 Rita Koiral

Soundtrack 

The soundtrack of Ganesh Talkies consists of 5 songs composed by Neel Dutt and Rabindranath Tagore the lyrics of which were written by Srijato, Anjan Dutt and Rabindranath Tagore.

References

External links 
 

Bengali-language Indian films
2010s Bengali-language films
2013 films
Films set in Kolkata
Films directed by Anjan Dutt
Reliance Entertainment films